Romeo Anaya (5 April 1946 – 24 December 2015) was a Mexican professional boxer who competed from 1967 to 1980, holding the Lineal and WBA bantamweight titles from 1973 to 1974.

Professional career
Anaya won the Mexico bantamweight title in 1971. He became the world bantamweight champion when he defeated Lineal and WBA bantamweight champion Enrique Pinder of Panama on January 20, 1973. On November 3, 1973, Anaya met Arnold Taylor in a match refereed by Stanley Christodoulou in Johannesburg. The 14 round fight is considered by many to be one of boxing's classic fights. One South African sportswriter called it "the bloodiest fight in South African boxing history". Taylor suffered a cut and was knocked down once in round five and three times in round eight (the WBA has since adopted a rule where a fighter is automatically declared a knockout loser if he or she is knocked down three times in the same round). Nevertheless, Taylor also cut the champion, and, in round fourteen, he connected with a right hand to Anaya's jaw, sending him to the floor. Feeling that this was his moment to become a world champion, Taylor screamed to his trainers: "He's gone!" from a neutral corner. It took Anaya two minutes to get up, and Taylor won the Lineal and WBA bantamweight titles.

See also
List of bantamweight boxing champions
List of WBA world champions
List of Mexican boxing world champions

References

External links

Romeo Anaya - The Cyber Boxing Zone Encyclopedia

1946 births
2015 deaths
Mexican male boxers
Bantamweight boxers
Super-bantamweight boxers
Boxers from Chiapas
World bantamweight boxing champions
World Boxing Association champions